Thomas Ragland (born June 16, 1946) is an American former professional baseball player who appeared in 102 games in Major League Baseball, mostly as a second baseman, for the Washington Senators / Texas Rangers from  to , and the Cleveland Indians in 1973. He also played for seven different minor league clubs in parts of nine seasons spanning 1965–1974.

His professional baseball career began when he was selected by Washington in the 15th round of the first-ever amateur draft. He would not reach the MLB Senators until 1971, when he had early and late season auditions for the team, which was playing its final season in Washington. In 1972, the club's first year as the Texas Rangers, Ragland spent the first four months of the campaign at Triple-A Denver before his recall in late July. He appeared in 25 games through the end of the year, struggling at bat, collecting only ten hits. On November 30, 1972, he was traded to the Cleveland Indians for pitcher Vince Colbert.

He spent the full 1973 season with Cleveland, appearing in 67 games and starting 50 as the club's second baseman. He batted a respectable .257 with 47 hits. But during the off-season, his contract was sold to the Houston Astros' organization. With the veteran Tommy Helms entrenched at second base, Ragland played the entire year back at Triple-A Denver before retiring from the field.

In his 102 MLB games, Ragland collected 61 total hits, with nine doubles and one triple. He was credited with 14 runs batted in and batted .231 lifetime.

He returned to the Detroit area, where he worked for a local milk-processing plant and scouted for the Texas Rangers. He's a member of the Detroit High School Hall of Fame.

References

External links

 

1946 births
Living people
African-American baseball players
Baseball players from Alabama
Buffalo Bisons (minor league) players
Burlington Senators players
Cleveland Indians players
Denver Bears players
Geneva Senators players
High Point-Thomasville Hi-Toms players
Major League Baseball second basemen
People from Talladega, Alabama
Baseball players from Detroit
Texas Rangers players
Texas Rangers scouts
Washington Senators (1961–1971) players
Wytheville Senators players
21st-century African-American people
20th-century African-American sportspeople